Remus Faur (born 6 June 1989) is a Romanian biathlete. He competed in the 2018 Winter Olympics.

References

1989 births
Living people
Biathletes at the 2018 Winter Olympics
Romanian male biathletes
Olympic biathletes of Romania